Tennis competitions at the 2007 Games of the Small States of Europe in Monaco were held from June 5 to June 9 at the Monte Carlo Country Club in Monte Carlo. The tournament took place on Clay courts.

Events

Men's singles

Women's singles

Men's doubles

Women's doubles

References

2007 in tennis
2007 Games of the Small States of Europe
2007